Gymnosporia bachmannii is a species of plant in the family Celastraceae. It is endemic to South Africa.  It is threatened by habitat loss.

References

Flora of South Africa
bachmannii
Vulnerable plants
Taxonomy articles created by Polbot